Barry Edward Dagger (born 19 May 1937) is a British former sport shooter. Dagger competed in the 1976 Summer Olympics and in the 1984 Summer Olympics. He represented England in the 50 metres rifle prone, at the 1978 Commonwealth Games in Edmonton, Alberta, Canada. He represented England and won a gold medal in the 50 metres Rifle 3 Position (Pair) and a silver medal in the 10 metres Air Rifle (Pair), at the 1982 Commonwealth Games in Brisbane, Queensland, Australia.
Since retiring, Dagger has become a narrowboat owner and is active in the narrowboat communities, the boat is called shooters delight.

References

External links
 
 
 

1937 births
Living people
British male sport shooters
ISSF rifle shooters
Olympic shooters of Great Britain
Shooters at the 1976 Summer Olympics
Shooters at the 1984 Summer Olympics
Olympic bronze medallists for Great Britain
Olympic medalists in shooting
Medalists at the 1984 Summer Olympics
Commonwealth Games medallists in shooting
Commonwealth Games gold medallists for England
Commonwealth Games silver medallists for England
Shooters at the 1978 Commonwealth Games
Shooters at the 1982 Commonwealth Games
20th-century British people
Medallists at the 1982 Commonwealth Games